Robin Forster is a former Fijian international lawn bowler.

Bowls career
Forster has represented Fiji at the Commonwealth Games, in the fours at the 1986 Commonwealth Games.

She won a gold medal at the 1987 Asia Pacific Bowls Championships in the fours in Lae, Papua New Guinea. Two years earlier she had picked up a bronze medal in the fours at the inaugural 1985 Championships.

References

Fijian female bowls players
Living people
Bowls players at the 1986 Commonwealth Games
Year of birth missing (living people)